Kerstin Langkopf is a West German luger who competed in the late 1980s. She won a gold medal in the mixed team event at the FIL European Luge Championships 1988 in Königssee, West Germany.

Martini also finished 19th in the 2008-09 Luge World Cup.

References
List of European luge champions in the mixed team event. - accessed 24 January 2010.

German female lugers
Living people
Year of birth missing (living people)